Koriukivka is a town in Chernihiv Oblast (province) of Ukraine. It was founded in 1657, over 350 years ago. It is the administrative center of Koriukivka Raion. It hosts the administration of Koriukivka urban hromada, one of the hromadas of Ukraine. The population in 2021 is estimated to be

History
During the reign of the Hetman Bohdan Khmelnytsky in 1657, who was in search of free land for the nobility class and the settlers from the Right-Bank of Ukraine. A search headed by the Cossack Omel'yanov Karukoyu found the eventual site and deemed it fit for a small settlement due to the thick protection of the surrounding forests.

The city later suffered heavy losses during the Second World War and is a site of the World War II massacre. Koriukivka was almost totally burned, the population that lived there was exterminated with the Germans killing around 6,700 people and burning 1,290 homes. The destruction of Koriukivka together with its inhabitants is the largest single "reprisal raid" war crime of the Nazi occupation during World War II.

Geography and Climate

The city rests on the Brech river (a tributary of the Snov. The local climate is moderate, with adequate moisture. The average annual rainfall is 614 mm, including the warm period - 439 mm. The average annual temperature - 6,1C. The absolute maximum temperature is 37C, but at least – 35C.

Economy

Modern Koriukivka is one of the most promising cities within the Chernihiv region. There are a number of companies, the largest two of which is the corporation "Koriukivka factory of Technical Papers" (built on the sugar-refinery site burned during the Great Patriotic War or World War II) and the state enterprise "Koriukivka Forestry" production.

The city also has many successful and developing small businesses. With a registered list of small businesses 73 entrepreneurial activities involving 639 individuals. The city has 100 commercial enterprises, of which 26  are Consumer Cooperatives.

Many investors find Koriukivka an attractive site due to the presence of large tracts of forests, silica sand, clay and peat.

Historically the city has had great and old industrial traditions. In the mid-nineteenth century the foreign entrepreneur Karl Rauch founded a distillery and sugar factory. In 1871, the Koriukivka sugar factory employed 600 people. The plant produced a season of sugar worth more than 5.5 mln. Rubles. And in 1901 manufacturer LI Brodsky expanded the sugar-refinery, employing about 1,000 workers. In 1882 the Koriukivka sugar production was awarded the gold medal from the All-Russia Exhibition in Moscow, and after 18 years they received the highest award of the World Exhibition in Paris.

Education

Koryukovka has a gymnasium, two secondary schools of the third degree, two secondary schools with which there are 1850 pupils, an arts school, a sports school and two kindergartens with over 400 children.

Media

The district newspaper is called "Mayak" and there is a small radio-station that operates district-wide.

Infrastructure

Koriukivka City  is the center of the Koryukovka district within the Chernihiv region, located 100 km from the regional center Chernhiv city. - in the northern territory. The city is also located at the intersection of highways of regional and local importance, in which there is a bus connection to the regional center and the neighboring district center: Snovsk, Mena, Semenivka and to other settlements in the area. The Koryukovka area has five public roads of local significance, all of which are paved (T - 25 – 12; T - 25 – 19; T - 25 – 32; T - 25 – 34 and T - 25 - 36).

The city planning structure is complicated with what is locally called a "multibeam-form" with similar districts spread around the various connecting roads. The area is built up unevenly, with most of the density in the city center. Here, in addition to a quarter of  the low- and multi-building, many service centers, schools, administrative, cultural, educational and medical facilities are located here as well. In the apartment buildings near the center there has developed an addition set of daily service institutions (preschool, school, shopping, etc.).

In terms of the engineering arrangements within Koriukivka, many districts are significantly different.

The city has a central district hospital with 220 beds, a pharmacy, two cultural centers with 800 seats, two libraries, a historical museum, and a stadium named "Avangard".

Sister cities
 Kazlų Rūda, Lithuania

References

External links
Official website
The murder of the Jews of Koriukivka during World War II, at Yad Vashem website.

Cities in Chernihiv Oblast
Cities of district significance in Ukraine
Chernigov Governorate
Holocaust locations in Ukraine